The Glacier Point Trailside Museum was one of the first projects in Yosemite National Park by Herbert Maier in what would become the National Park Service Rustic style. Located at Glacier Point, it was funded by Laura Spelman Rockefeller's estate as a project for the Yosemite Museum. It was the first "trailside museum" in the National Park system and was a prototype for enhanced visitor interpretation services in the parks.

The museum is in reality a small stone shelter with arched openings on the north, east, and west sides. The roof is supported by log timbers.

See also
Architects of the National Park Service
National Register of Historic Places listings in Yosemite National Park
National Register of Historic Places listings in Mariposa County, California

References

Museums in Mariposa County, California
Natural history museums in California
Buildings and structures completed in 1924
National Register of Historic Places in Mariposa County, California
National Register of Historic Places in Yosemite National Park
Park buildings and structures on the National Register of Historic Places in California
Rustic architecture in California
Defunct museums in California
1924 establishments in California
National Park Service museums